Messe is a German word meaning trade fair; a German and a French word meaning mass (liturgy) and mass (music).

Places

Germany
 Messe Erfurt, convention centre in Erfurt, Germany
 Messe Frankfurt, convention centre  operator in Frankfurt am Main, Germany
 Messe München, convention centre operator in Munich, Germany
 Hamburg Messe, convention centre operator in Hamburg, Germany
 Messe Wien, convention centre in Vienna, Austria 
 Messe-Prater station, subway station
 Messezentrum Nuremberg, Nuremberg, Germany 
 Messe (Nuremberg U-Bahn), subway station
 Hannover Messe/Laatzen station, serving Hannover Messe

Japan
 Makuhari Messe, a convention centre in Chiba City, Chiba
 Toki Messe, a convention centre in Niigata, Niigata Prefecture
 Osaka Auto Messe, an annual auto show that is held at Intex Osaka

Other places 
 Messé, France
 Messe (Greece), a town of ancient Greece

Music
 Mass (music)
 Messe I.X–VI.X, a 2013 album by Norwegian band Ulver
 Musikmesse, a music trade fair in Germany

People with the surname
 Giovanni Messe (1883–1968), Italian politician and Field Marshal

See also
 
 Mass (disambiguation)
 Mess (disambiguation)
 Messa (disambiguation)
 Messehalle (disambiguation)
 Messi (disambiguation)
 Messy (disambiguation)